"El Clavo" (English: "The Nail") is a song by Dominican-American singer Prince Royce. The audio and music video were both released on March 18, 2018. On May 11, 2018, the remix was released which featured Colombian artist Maluma. The music video was released on August 28, 2018.

Charts

Weekly charts

Year-end charts

Certifications

See also
List of Billboard number-one Latin songs of 2018

References

2018 songs
2018 singles
Prince Royce songs
Maluma songs
Sony Music Latin singles
Spanish-language songs
Male vocal duets
Songs written by Edgar Barrera
Songs written by Prince Royce
Songs written by Camilo (singer)